International cricket played in the 2006 cricket season is defined as matches scheduled between May and August 2006 in all cricketing countries, as well as all international matches scheduled for the 2006 English cricket season. Matches between January and April are defined as belonging to the 2005–06 season, while matches between September and December are defined as the 2006–07 season. The main matches in this period were played in England, as this was in the middle of the English cricket season, but the third edition of the ICC Intercontinental Cup is defined as a part of the 2006 season, even though the tournament stretched into February 2007, and three A teams were also scheduled to tour the northwestern part of Australia in June and July 2006.

Season overview

ICC Championship Tables in May 2006

April 2006

EurAsia Cricket Series

This was a series held at the Sheikh Zayed Cricket Stadium in Abu Dhabi, between three A teams (second-choice teams) from Test-playing nations, two A teams from One Day International-playing nations, and the hosting nation UAE. India A and Pakistan A played in the final, while Netherlands A and Ireland A went home without any wins. UAE finished second in their group, after winning two games, while Sri Lanka A's three wins saw them second behind Pakistan A.

The top team from Group A and the second and third placed in Group B were placed in Group C; the others in Group D. Results from the first group stage were carried forward.

Zimbabwe in West Indies

A Test match series was originally planned, but Zimbabwe withdrew temporarily from Test cricket before this tour, and it was instead agreed to arrange seven One Day Internationals instead of five

Zimbabweans in West Indies in 2006. One-Day International series result: West Indies won 5-0.

May 2006

Sri Lanka in England

England return home on the back of a disastrous Winter tour of the sub-continent, having not won any of the series before or after Christmas; while Sri Lanka look to compound their win against Bangladesh.

Sri Lankans in England 2006: Test Series drawn 1-1. Sri Lanka win Twenty20 International. Sri Lanka win ODI series 5-0.

Triangular Series (Bermuda, Canada, Zimbabwe)

This tournament was held in Trinidad immediately follow the ODI series between Zimbabwe and West Indies. Zimbabwe won the tournament after going through unbeaten, while Bermuda finished second after winning their inaugural ODI - before losing twice to Zimbabwe.

India in West Indies

June 2006

England in Ireland

Ireland lost their debut One Day International, but England's win described by Cricinfo as "unspectacular", with Marcus Trescothick making 113 after England chose to bat first. Irish native Ed Joyce opened the innings for England, scoring 10 before he was caught by Kevin O'Brien, but a 142-run partnership between Trescothick and Ian Bell for the fourth wicket brought 200 up for England. England scored 84 off the last ten overs, with Bell making an ODI career high of 80. Ireland did bat out 50 overs, but no one could match the scores of Trescothick and Bell; Andre Botha made the best attempt, but his 52 lasted 89 balls, well below the required run rate of six an over. Steve Harmison took three wickets, but conceded 58 runs after bowling an opening spell described by The Times as "a curate's egg". Ireland's highest-scoring partnership was for the seventh wicket, with Andrew White adding 64 with O'Brien.

Bangladesh A in Zimbabwe

Bangladesh A toured Zimbabwe for three first class and five one-day matches against the A team of the hosting nation. The first-class series ended in a draw after Bangladesh A fell to defeat in the third match after giving Zimbabwe A the first-innings lead of 203 to eventually lose the match by seven wickets. However, Bangladesh A secured the one-day series by winning the first three games.

Zimbabwe A v Bangladesh A. First-class series: Drawn 1–1. One-day series: Bangladesh A won 4–1.

Pakistan in Scotland

Pakistan won the match by five wickets, after Scotland lost four wickets in the first eight overs and then four more in the remaining 42. Ryan Watson and Neil McCallum put on 116 for the fifth wicket, an ODI record partnership for Scotland, who played their first ODI for seven years. Their innings also doubled the number of ODI fifties scored for Scotland.

EAP Cricket Trophy

This tournament determined one qualifier from the East-Asia Pacific region to Division Three of the 2007 World Cricket League. Three teams, Cook Islands (qualified from the 2005 ICC EAP Cricket Cup), Fijian and Japan (qualified from the 2005 ICC EAP Cricket Cup) played in the tournament, which was held in Brisbane using a double round robin format.  Fiji went through the tournament unbeaten.

EAP Cricket Trophy. Teams: Cook Islands, Fiji, Japan. Winners: Fiji

July 2006

Sri Lanka in the Netherlands

Sri Lanka batted first in both matches, and won both. In the first match, they surpassed the world record ODI total set by South Africa four months earlier, making 443 for four on their way to a 195-run victory. Both Sanath Jayasuriya and Tillakaratne Dilshan made centuries. Sri Lanka made two changes for the second match, with Jayasuriya resting, and still won the second match by 55 runs

Sri Lanka in the Netherlands in 2006. One-day International series: Sri Lanka won 2–0.

Top End Series

The top end refers to the "Top End" of Australia geographically, i.e. the cities of Darwin and Cairns, who are set to host these matches

Pakistan in England

After a draw in the first Test, Andrew Strauss led his team to back-to-back Test victories and secured the series before the fourth and final Test. That Test was marred by a ball-tampering controversy, which culminated in Pakistan refusing to take the field after the tea interval in protest to a decision by umpire Darrell Hair to penalise the Pakistani team for ball-tampering. This led the umpires eventually to award the game to England, who thus won the Test series 3–0. 

Pakistani cricket team in England in 2006. Test series result: England won 3–0. Twenty20 International: Pakistan won one-off match. One-day International Series: Drawn 2–2.

South Africa in Sri Lanka

Originally, South Africa was set to play Sri Lanka and India in the tri-nation Unitech Cup one-day cricket tournament. Following a series of bomb blasts in the Sri Lankan capital, South Africa withdrew from the tournament.

Bangladesh in Zimbabwe

The tour included only five One Day International, as Zimbabwe have voluntarily withdrawn from Test cricket.

Bangladeshis in Zimbabwe in 2006. ODI series: Zimbabwe won 3–2.

Indian Women in Ireland and England

Indian Women in Ireland and England. One-day Internationals in Ireland: India won 2–0. One-day Internationals in England: England won 4–0. Test match: India won the one-off Test match.

August 2006

European Championship

Division One of the 2006 European Cricket Championship consisted of five teams, Denmark, Ireland, Italy, Netherlands and Scotland. The three matches between Ireland, the Netherlands and Scotland were official One-day Internationals, though the match between Netherlands and Ireland was called off. Despite finishing last, Italy qualified for World Cricket League Div III because of other 4 nations already qualified for the league, so Italy claims the place as the best non-qualified nation.

Kenya in Canada

This was originally scheduled to be a triangular series between Bermuda, Canada and Kenya. However, after Kenya rescheduled their ODIs with Bangladesh due to their lack of financial backing, they also cancelled their matches against Bermuda. The ODI series followed the Intercontinental Cup tie between the two nations, which Canada shaded by 25 runs; however, in the short form, Kenya won after bowling Canada out for 129 in the first match and 94 in the second.

Kenyans in Canada in 2006. ODI series: Kenya won 2–0.

Bangladesh in Kenya

Bangladesh were originally scheduled to play three One Day International matches between 19 July and 23 July. However, the Kenyan board had to postpone the matches for three weeks due to lack of funds.

Bangladesh in Kenya in 2006. ODI series: Bangladesh won 3–0.

India in Sri Lanka

As in 2005, Sri Lanka were set to start their international home season with a triangular series at home following a 2-Test series. India came to visit, in addition to the already touring South Africans, and the three teams were set to contest 2006 Unitech Cup. The first four matches was scheduled to be held in Dambulla, and the last three, two group matches and a final, will be held at the R. Premadasa Stadium in Colombo. However, the venue of the series became an issue in the elections for presidency of Sri Lanka Cricket, with the sitting presidents wishing to move the series to Colombo, as they feared sabotage from the opposition group if the opposition lost the elections. The opposition, however, wanted to host the matches in Dambulla. On 13 July, the Board of Control for Cricket in India said that their team would play all matches in Colombo, and a few days later a group of former cricketers were nominated to run Sri Lanka Cricket after the elections were cancelled after advice from the country's president, Mahinda Rajapakse.

The tournament was postponed by two days following rain and a bomb blast near the South African team hotel. After receiving an independent security report, the United Cricket Board of South Africa announced that they were pulling out of the tournament, leaving India and Sri Lanka to play a three-match series. The first of these games was rained off.

The series is later cancelled due to rain and bad weather during the three ODIs, the series will be played as a tri-series in 2007, after the World Cup.

Indians in Sri Lanka in 2006.

Asian Cricket Council Trophy

This tournament is arranged by the Asian Cricket Council and is open to every non-Test member nation of the ACC. 17 nations are taking part in the event in Kuala Lumpur. At stake are places in the World Cricket League, along with berths in the 2008 Asia Cup.

Despite losing in the final, Hong Kong advanced to the World Cricket League Division Three due to U.A.E. already qualified for this league.

Bermuda in Canada

The last of these matches will be part of the Americas Cricket Championship.

Americas Championship

Canada hosted the Americas Cricket Championship, and participated along with Argentina, Bermuda, Cayman Islands and USA. The tournament took place between 21 August and 26 August.

Canada, Bermuda and the USA had already qualified for the World Cricket League based on their performances in the 2005 ICC Trophy, and, as Cayman Islands finished in third place ahead of Argentina, the Caymans qualified for Division Three of the 2007 League. Bermuda won all their games except for a rained-off clash with USA, while Canada lost their first two and failed to get better than fourth despite a ten-wicket win over USA in the final game.

 Cayman Islands finished ahead of Canada due to head-to-head result.

African Championship

This tournament was held in Dar-es-Salaam between the five top African nations that have not already qualified for the global divisions of the World Cricket League through performances at the 2005 ICC Trophy. Five teams took part, four of which, Botswana, Nigeria, Tanzania and Zambia all took part at the 2004 Six Nations World Cup Qualifying Series Tournament in Africa, finishing from third to sixth, while Mozambique won the Africa Division Two event in April to qualify for this Division One tournament. The winner of this tournament, the hosts Tanzania, qualified for Division Three in the global World Cricket League.

ICC Championship Tables in September 2006

Test statistics

Results

Batting statistics

Bowling statistics

ODI statistics

Results

Batting statistics

Bowling statistics

References

Further references
 The CricInfo Archives - 2006

2006 in cricket